List of Iran's parliament representatives (5th term) or "List of the representatives of Iran's Islamic Consultative Assembly (5th term)" includes a list which mentions all members of the Majlis of Iran (i.e. Islamic Consultative Assembly) plus the names of the constituencies, provinces, and their political factions. The list is as follows:

See also 
 List of Representatives of the Parliament of Iran
 List of Iran's parliament representatives (11th term)

References 

Islamic Consultative Assembly elections
Islamic Consultative Assembly